There are several elaborations for BIDS.

 Business Intelligence Development Studio
 Bangladesh Institute of Development Studies
 Boeing Integrated Defense Systems
 Microsoft's Business Intelligence Development Studio, a development environment for building business intelligence solutions
 The U.S.-Mexico Border Infectious Disease Surveillance Project, a three-year infectious disease surveillance project undertaken by the Centers for Disease Control and Prevention and the Mexican Secretariat of Health.
 Brain Imaging Data Structure, a standard for organizing, annotating, and describing data collected during neuroimaging experiments.

See also
 BID (disambiguation)